Mushet is a surname. Notable people with the surname include:

 David Mushet (1772–1847), Scottish engineer and metallurgist
 Robert Mushet (1782–1828), Scottish official of the Royal Mint, and writer on financial topics
 Robert Forester Mushet (1811–1891), British metallurgist and businessman